Etrian Odyssey 2 Untold: The Fafnir Knight is a role-playing video game developed and published by Atlus for the Nintendo 3DS. It is part of the Etrian Odyssey series, and is a remake of Etrian Odyssey II: Heroes of Lagaard. It was released in Japan in November 2014, in North America in August 2015, and in the PAL region in February 2016.

Gameplay
There are two modes, Classic mode and the Story mode first introduced in Etrian Odyssey Untold: The Millennium Girl. Classic mode is the same as other entries, with custom characters and maps. Story mode has an expansive story with preset characters, cutscenes and voice acting, but the players will have to draw their own dungeon maps just like in Classic Mode. The game also contains three difficulty settings: Picnic, which allows for easy gameplay; Normal, which allows for moderately difficult but manageable gameplay; and Expert, which allows for the toughest gameplay possible.

Characters
As with its predecessor Etrian Odyssey Untold: The Millennium Girl, Story Mode has five playable characters available to the player:

Fafnir Knight: The player's avatar, given a customized name by the player. A young man from the Midgard Library who is dispatched to High Lagaard to assist the daughter of the Duke of Caledonia in venturing through Ginnungagap.

Flavio: An adventurer and the best friend of the player's avatar. An energetically positive 18 year old young man who sometimes acts as a voice of reason within the group.

Arianna Caledonia: The daughter of the Duke of Caledonia, a very ladylike but scatterbrained 18-year-old girl. She is escorted by the player's avatar and Flavio throughout Ginnungagap to complete her ritual.

Bertrand de Gervaise: First introduced in Ginnungagap. A knight of unknown age with a lazy personality, but can be serious and protective when needed. He tries to keep his past hidden from the player and group.

Chloe: First introduced in Ginnungagap, later explained to be a distant relative of Bertrand. An asocial 13-year-old girl who usually calls people by their job rather than their name and has an unnatural love of meat.

Reception

Critical reception for Etrian Odyssey 2 Untold: The Fafnir Knight has been positive. In Japan, Famitsu gave it a score of all four nines for a total of 36 out of 40.

Etrian Odyssey 2 Untold sold 59,531 copies in its first week of release in Japan.

Notes

References

External links

2014 video games
Fantasy video games
Atlus games
First-person party-based dungeon crawler video games
2 Untold The Fafnir Knight
Nintendo 3DS games
Nintendo 3DS eShop games
Nintendo 3DS-only games
Role-playing video games
Video game remakes
Video games scored by Yuzo Koshiro
Video games developed in Japan
Video games featuring protagonists of selectable gender